1 SGM is a census town in Ganganagar district  in the state of Rajasthan, India.

Demographics
 India census, 1 SGM had a population of 2493. Males constitute 53% of the population and females 47%. 1 SGM has an average literacy rate of 43%, lower than the national average of 59.5%; with 64% of the males and 36% of females literate. 19% of the population is under 6 years of age.

References

Cities and towns in Sri Ganganagar district